The Hengqin extension line is a line of the Macau Light Rapid Transit currently under construction, planned to open in 2025. The line will operate as a shuttle between the existing Lotus Checkpoint station on the Taipa line and Hengqin Checkpoint station on the island of Hengqin. The line will be 2.2km long, and 900m will be underground, including Hengqin Checkpoint station.

References

Light rail in Macau